1947 in the Philippines details events of note that happened in the Philippines in 1947.

Incumbents
 President: Manuel Roxas (Liberal) 
 Vice President: Elpidio Quirino (Liberal) 
 Chief Justice: Manuel Moran
 Congress: 1st

Events

January
 January 28 – President Roxas issues an amnesty proclamation to collaborators.

March
 March 14 – The Treaty of General Relations between Philippines and United States was signed.

June
 June 20:
Dagupan becomes a city in the province of Pangasinan through Republic Act 170 and ratified on the same day.
Lipa becomes a city in the province of Batangas through Republic Act 162 and ratified on the same day.
 June 21:
Pasay becomes a city (formerly as city of Rizal) in the province of Rizal through Republic Act 183 and ratified on August 16.
Ormoc becomes a city in the province of Leyte through Republic Act 179 and ratified on October 20.

September
 September 8 – The Philippine representative to the Far Eastern Commission, Carlos P. Romulo, signs the Japanese Peace Treaty.

Holidays

As per Act No. 2711 section 29, issued on March 10, 1917, any legal holiday of fixed date falls on Sunday, the next succeeding day shall be observed as legal holiday. Sundays are also considered legal religious holidays. Bonifacio Day was added through Philippine Legislature Act No. 2946. It was signed by then-Governor General Francis Burton Harrison in 1921. On October 28, 1931, the Act No. 3827 was approved declaring the last Sunday of August as National Heroes Day.

 January 1 – New Year's Day
 February 22 – Legal Holiday
 April 3 – Maundy Thursday
 April 4 – Good Friday
 May 1 – Labor Day
 July 4 – Philippine Republic Day
 August 13 – Legal Holiday
 August 31 – National Heroes Day
 November 28 – Thanksgiving Day
 December 25 – Christmas Day
 December 30 – Rizal Day

Births
 January 7 – Angelito Sarmiento, Filipino politician (d. 2015)
 January 9 – Roilo Golez, Filipino politician (d. 2018)
 January 23 – Baldo Marro, Filipino actor (d. 2017)
 January 27 – Perfecto Yasay Jr., Filipino politician (d. 2020)
 January 31 – Laurice Guillen, Filipino actress and director
 February 11 – Johnny Manahan, film and television director
 March 10 – June Keithley, Filipino actress and journalist (d. 2013)
 April 4  – Eliseo Soriano, Filipino televangelist (d. 2021)
 April 5  – Gloria Macapagal Arroyo, 14th president of the Philippines
 April 16 – Nova Villa, Filipino actress and a veteran comedian
 May 9 – Josie Natori, fashion designer and the CEO and founder of The Natori Company
 May 23 – Maita Gomez, Filipino beauty queen and activist (d. 2012)
 May 24 – Mike de Leon, Filipino film director, cinematographer, scriptwriter and film producer.
 May 31 – Vincent Crisologo, Filipino politician
 June 24 – Romulo T. Dela Cruz, D.D., prelate of the Roman Catholic Church in the Philippines
 July 6 – Roy Señeres, Filipino businessman and diplomat (d. 2016)
 August 8 – Snaffu Rigor, composer (d. 2016)
 September 5 – Danny Florencio, Filipino basketball player (d. 2018)
 September 9 –  Yoyong Martirez, basketball player, actor, comedian and politician
 September 16 – Bangkay, comedian (d. 2018)
 September 18 – Joe Taruc, radio broadcaster (d. 2017)
 November 9 – Jun Bernardino, former Philippine Basketball Association commissioner. (d. 2007)
 November 27 – Ronaldo Valdez, Filipino film and television actor
 December 5 – Rudy Fernandez, triathlete
 December 10 – Dick Israel, Filipino actor (d. 2016)
 December 21 – Dimasangcay Pundato, Muslim Filipino former revolutionary leader, undersecretary of the Office of the Presidential Adviser on the Peace Process (d. 2020)
 December 24 – Ricky Belmonte, Filipino actor (d. 2001)
 December 25 – Pepe Smith, Filipino singer-songwriter, drummer and guitarist (d. 2019)

Unknown
Ruben Habito
Cecilia Manguerra Brainard, author and editor of nineteen books

Deaths
 May 14 – Francisco Alonso Liongson (born 1896)
 August 29 – Crispín Oben, Politician (born 1876)
 September 18 – Julian Cruz Balmaceda, Filipino poet, essayist, playwright, novelist, journalist and linguist. (born 1885)
 September 28 – Francisco Santiago, Filipino musician. (born 1889)
 December 20 – Benigno Aquino, Sr., Filipino Politician. (born 1894)

Unknown Date
August – Teresa Magbanua, schoolteacher and military leader (born 1868)
Alejandro Melchor, Filipino civil engineer, mathematician, educator, and member of the Cabinet of the Philippines. (born 1900)

References